West Mead may refer to:

West Mead Township, Crawford County, Pennsylvania, a township in the United States
, also Westmead, a United States Navy cargo ship in commission from 1918 to 1919

See also
Westmead (disambiguation)
Westmeath (disambiguation)